Sitsongpeenong is a Muay Thai gym in Bangkok, Thailand.

Fighters
The gym is home to several notable fighters, who use the gym's name as their ring name. They include:

Kem Sitsongpeenong (born 1984)
Manaowan Sitsongpeenong (born 1996)
Sitthichai Sitsongpeenong (born 1991)
Thongchai Sitsongpeenong (born 1996)
Yodpayak Sitsongpeenong (born 1993)

Kickboxing in Thailand